Christian Wibe (born December 1981) is a Norwegian composer, musician and music producer. With his band Animal Alpha of which he was founder and main composer, he released 2 albums and 1 EP. Christian has also produced, engineered and mixed albums for other artists, several of which have been nominated for, and won, the "Norwegian Grammys".

In 2008, Christian composed his first score for Tommy Wirkola's film Dead Snow. Since then he's composed the music for several feature films, TV series and commercials.

References

External links 

1981 births
Living people
Norwegian musicians
Place of birth missing (living people)